Myles Gaskin (born February 15, 1997) is an American football running back for the Miami Dolphins of the National Football League (NFL). He played college football at Washington.

Early years
Gaskin was raised in Lynnwood, Washington, a suburb north of Seattle. He attended the Alderwood Boys and Girls Club where his athleticism playing basketball was noted by his coach.

Gaskin attended O'Dea High School in Seattle, Washington. As a junior, he rushed for 2,182 yards and 35 touchdowns and as a senior he had 1,567 yards and 25 touchdowns. Myles also ran track, competing in the 100 meter dash and the 4 by 100 meter relay. He committed to the University of Washington to play college football.

College career
Gaskin became Washington's starting running back his true freshman year in 2015. He became the first true freshman in school history to rush for over 1,000 yards, finishing with 1,302 on 227 carries. He also set a freshman record with 14 rushing touchdowns. He was named the MVP of the 2015 Heart of Dallas Bowl after rushing for 181 yards and four touchdowns. Gaskin played in all 14 games of his sophomore season, amassing 1,373 yards and 10 touchdowns. He was named to the All-Pac-12 first-team following the regular season.

In his statistically most-successful junior year, Gaskin led the Pac-12 with 21 rushing touchdowns and 24 total touchdowns, and was fifth in the conference in rushing yards. In the fourth game of the season at Colorado, he rushed for 202 yards, the only 200+ game of his career. His productivity declined slightly his senior year, but he still became the first Pac-12 player with four 1000+ rushing-yard-seasons, and led the 2018 Huskies to conference championship and the Rose Bowl. There, in the last game of his college career, Gaskin rushed for two touchdowns and passed for a third in his only career pass attempt, all in the fourth quarter.

Gaskin finished his career at Washington with a school-record 62 touchdowns (2nd in Pac-12 history to Royce Freeman) and 5,323 rushing yards (3rd to Freeman and Charles White). He also holds school records for 100-rushing-yard games (26), rush attempts (945), rushing yards per game (102.4), rushing touchdowns (57), rushes of 50+ yards (10), and all-purpose yards (5,878).

Professional career

Gaskin was drafted by the Miami Dolphins in the seventh round, 234th overall, of the 2019 NFL Draft, the last of 25 running backs taken and the second by the Dolphins. In Week 16, in the 38–35 overtime victory over the Cincinnati Bengals, he scored his first career touchdown on a two-yard run. He was placed on injured reserve on December 24, 2019. He appeared in seven games as a rookie and recorded 133 rushing yards and one rushing touchdown to go along with seven receptions for 51 receiving yards.

In 2020, Gaskin started the season as backup to Matt Breida and Jordan Howard. In his first career start in Week 3, he had a career-best 95 yards from scrimmage in a victory over Jacksonville. In Week 6, Gaskin had 49 yards on the Dolphins' second series, en route to 126 yards from scrimmage in a 24-0 win over the Jets. He was placed on injured reserve on November 5, 2020, with a sprained MCL. He was activated on December 5, 2020. He was placed on the reserve/COVID-19 list by the team on December 12, 2020, and activated on December 23. In Week 16 against the Las Vegas Raiders, Gaskin rushed for 87 yards and recorded 5 catches for 82 yards and 2 touchdowns one being a 59 yard reception from Ryan Fitzpatrick during the 26–25 win.

Gaskin was the starter for most games in Miami's 2021 season, but carried 5 or fewer times in six of them. His 846 yards from scrimmage was second on the 9-8 team to Jaylen Waddle, but splitting carries with Duke Johnson the Dolphins struggled to an NFL-second-worst 3.5 yards per rush. Bright spots included 10 catches for 74 yards and 2 touchdowns in a Week 5 loss to the Tampa Bay Buccaneers, and 89 yards rushing with a receiving touchdown in a Week 15 win over the New York Jets.

On March 16, 2023, Gaskin signed a one-year contract extension with the Dolphins.

NFL career statistics

See also
 Washington Huskies football statistical leaders

References

External links
Miami Dolphins bio
Washington Huskies bio

1997 births
Living people
American football running backs
People from Lynnwood, Washington
Players of American football from Washington (state)
Sportspeople from the Seattle metropolitan area
Washington Huskies football players
Miami Dolphins players